Limacellopsis is a genus of mushroom-forming fungi in the family Amanitaceae in order Agaricales. Analysis of DNA  sequences was used to show that Limacellopsis was separate from Limacella which is similar in appearance. The name Limacellopsis means like-Limacella.

References

Amanitaceae
Agaricales genera